Basic Education High School No. 3 Shwebo (commonly known as Shwebo 3 High School) is a public high school located in Shwebo, Sagaing Region, Myanmar.

References

External links

Shwebo District
Buildings and structures in Sagaing Region
Secondary schools in Myanmar